Intuitive American Esoteric is the name of a limited three-volume, multi-label series of LP records by Nautical Almanac member Twig Harper, released between 2005 and 2006. Each album features a standard cut recording on side A and a handmade lathe-cut recording featuring numerous locked grooves on side B. Regarding the first two records in the series, Harper commented:

"I released "Intuitive American Esoteric" vol 1 +2 on LP, one side was mastered normally the other side were examples of  lathe cuts. For volume 1 I cut the lathe master plate real scratchy and distant. On vol 2 the lathe side was experiments of sine waves cut on top of each other, at various depths and frequency."

Volume 1 
"Untitled"
"Untitled"

Volume 2 
"Untitled"
"Untitled"

Volume 3 
"Untitled"
"Untitled"

References 

Noise music
Electronic albums by American artists